Panaeolus rubricaulis is a species of mushroom in the Bolbitiaceae family.

See also
List of Psilocybin mushrooms
Psilocybin mushrooms
Psilocybe

References

rubricaulis